"Samantha" is a song recorded by British rappers Dave and J Hus. The song was written by Dave and J Hus, and produced by Jae5.

Commercially, the song reached number 63 in the United Kingdom. In June 2020, it was certified as Platinum by the British Phonographic Industry for exceeding chart sales of 600,000.

Charts

Certifications

References

2017 singles
2017 songs
Dave (rapper) songs
J Hus songs
British hip hop songs
Songs written by Dave (rapper)
Songs written by J Hus